TMH may refer to:

Tallahassee Memorial HealthCare
TimedMediaHandler, Wikimedia extension to display audio and video files in wiki pages
TMH Polonia Bytom
tmh, the ISO 630 code for the Tuareg languages
Transmashholding
Tuen Mun Hospital, a public hospital in Hong Kong
Tuen Mun Hospital stop, by MTR station code

See also
TMHS (disambiguation)